Bacchi tempel öppnat vid en hjältes död ("The Temple of Bacchus opened at a Hero's Death"), commonly known as Bacchi Tempel is a song play, a long poem in two thousand alexandrines, written by Carl Michael Bellman and published by Sweden's royal printing press in 1783. The illustrator was Elias Martin. The work had been preceded by a version from 1779 titled "Bacchi Temple opened at the death of Corporal and Order Oboist Father Movitz", but had been reworked and expanded several times. 

The work has probably never been performed in its entirety, but individual songs are sometimes performed by the Par Bricole society. It has been described as a curious hybrid, a combination of comic opera and mock-heroic verse, and as a not very satisfactory work, despite the "lovely" song Böljan sig mindre rör (Still'd is the hasty wave).

Context

The songs originate in Carl Michael Bellman's performances on the theme The Order of Bacchus (Bacchi Orden), starting in 1769-1771, after which the production was largely unseen until 1777. That the production of song games, of which Bacchi Tempel was the most important, was resumed can probably be linked to the  Par Bricole society at the end of the 1770s. In contrast to the previous parodies, the new social life was strictly ritualized with many participants, the style more solemn and the music more ambitious. In addition, several of the figures from Bellman's songbook Fredman's Epistles have now been identified in the cast: both Movitz and Mollberg have minor roles, while Ulla Winblad has taken on a central role as leader of the "Bacchi priestesses".

Bellman began work on what would become Bacchi Tempel soon after the news of the death of the model of his corporal Movitz in May 1779; an initial print was dedicated to the court engraver  at the end of the year with the hope of engaging him for an illustrated edition of the work. This failed, but later he succeeded in getting Elias and Johan Fredrik Martin to illustrate the work. Bellman continued to work on it, adding, among other things, long descriptions of nature in alexandrines in the style of James Thomson.

The work was advertised for sale via subscription in Stockholms Posten in September 1782, as a "poetic, comic and musical work". The announcement was aimed at "lovers of madness", which again points to ambitions. However, the work was not printed until the end of 1783, and new advertisements pointed to its suitability as a Christmas present.

Publication

Bacchi Tempel was published in 1783 by Kongliga Tryckeriet, the Swedish royal printing press in Stockholm. It was Bellman's first book. The illustrations were by the landscape painter Elias Martin; they were engraved by his brother Johan Fredrik Martin. The brothers were friends of Bellman's; Elias had studied painting, especially Hogarth's, in London, had visited and painted an ornamental Temple of Bacchus in Painshill Park at Cobham, Surrey, and had come back to Stockholm in 1780. The book had been planned as the first volume of a two-volume set; the second was to have been Fröjas Tempel ("Freya's Temple"), but it never appeared.

Summary

The play takes place around a temple dedicated to Bacchus, the god of wine, on an island of mixed flora and fauna: there are pine trees and crows as well as parrots and almond trees. Somewhere nearby, the goddess of pleasure Fröja also has a temple. Around the temple, a celebration is being commemorated by the dead Movitz, initially by a group of supporters under the leadership of the highly pregnant Ulla Winblad. The work begins with a stormy night, but at dawn the storm passes and everything turns into rural idyll, and the readers are informed that it is Movitz who is the father of Ulla's children, and she describes how it came to be in this particular place. Then the male participants, the "brothers of the order" arrive in boats, led by the order's "grenadier" Mollberg and its sexton Trundman, and march up to the temple. When they arrive, together with barrels of drink, songs and celebrations are held in honour first of the dead, then of Trundman and the brothers, Ulla and the priests, the order's chancellor Planberg, and finally the head of the order, Janke Jensen. The rituals are interrupted from time to time by various intermezzos, but eventually fade out completely as Ulla gives birth to a new Movitz, and everything turns into a happy party.

The extended version seems to have become difficult to play; where the original version could be performed in one hour, the final one required at least two. The entire extension is due to longer monologues and additional pieces of music, making it rather static as a piece of theatre.

The added landscape depictions are partly based on the nature being painted as a picture, which, however, must at the same time be animated and linked together with the speaker's emotions. Thus, when the initial storm is portrayed by the Bacchus priestess, it is not only a storm, but also her own anxiety and terror as described, in pre-romantic style. When the storm has subsided, the priestesses' attitude to the surroundings also changes, and the now pastoral landscape instead evokes happy memories of past happiness, when Movitz with roses in his hair used to honour the wine god with song. Ulla then takes the word, and more and more excitedly she describes his memories of him, before she sees through a telescope both the love goddess in the sky and a young "nymph" named Belinda.

When the men arrive, the women quickly become more crass: they describe the "Knights of Bacchus" in ironic terms as "heroes" who, however, urinate on planks and resemble roast pigs. Sexton Trundman takes over and describes the night's storm, with words taken from Jacob Wallenberg's  ("My son at the galley"), possibly to add an air of authenticity.

In the closing passage, spoken by Janke Jensen, it is no longer a question of depicting nature: now a mythological tableau is painted, with Movitz on Mount Olympus together with ancient gods and heroes such as  Mars, Pompey, and Hannibal. Suddenly he turns back to mortality, and goes on to portray Movitz's earthly existence as a drunkard, until he is interrupted by Ulla giving birth to his and Movitz's children, who resemble him right down to his red nose.

Reception

The Swedish scholar Lars Lönnroth called the book "a curious hybrid of comic opera and mock-heroic poetry", and one of Bellman's "most ambitious" projects, intended, in response to Kellgren's attack, to prove that he was a serious poet. Lönnroth notes that  "finally" gave the book a thorough scholarly examination; Breitholtz numbered it among the "most interesting literary experiments in 18th century literature". 

The English biographer of Bellman, Paul Britten Austin, wrote that Bacchi Tempel was "exhausting" to read, and that while it contained "a few very beautiful lyrics", such as "the lovely Böljan sig mindre rör (Still'd is the hasty wave) with its butterfly-wing delicacy", the song play was "not a very satisfactory work". The song "Still'd is the hasty wave" was recorded in English by Martin Best in 1975.

Songs included 

 Flodens sorl och vädrens fläkt
 Böljan sig mindre rör
 Bakom dessa gröna lindar
 Uppå vattnets lugna våg
 Sälla strand, där vi nu landa
 Marsch, över allt, följ Martis spår
 Manskap, giv akt
 Hurra, se min fåla
 Skåden hit, märk och minns
 Om ödet skull' mig skicka
 Sjung mina söner alla tolv
 Sjungom systrar, Fröjas ära
 Tom är min flaska, tunnan utrunnen
 Hvem är, som ej vår broder mins?
 Bort allt vad oro gör

References

Sources

External links

 The songs from Bacchi Tempel on Swedish Wikisource
 Bacchi Tempel as digital facsimile at Litteraturbanken

Works by Carl Michael Bellman
1783 in Sweden